Boxing competitions at the 2021 Southeast Asian Games took place at Bắc Ninh Gymnasium in Bắc Ninh, Vietnam from 16 to 22 May 2022.

Medal table

Medalists

Men

Women

Results

Men's Flyweight (48-52 kg)

Men's Bantamweight (57 kg)

Men's Lightweight (63 kg)

Men's Welterweight (69 kg)

Men's Middleweight (75 kg)

Men's Light Heavyweight (81 kg)

Men's Heavyweight (91 kg)

Women's Light Flyweight (45-48 kg)

Women's Flyweight (51 kg)

Women's Featherweight (57 kg)

Women's Lightweight (60 kg)

References

Boxing
2021